Joseph Alfred Pierre Hormisdas "Pit" Lépine (July 30, 1901 – August 2, 1955) was a Canadian ice hockey forward and coach. He was born in Sainte-Anne-de-Bellevue, Quebec.

Lepine played in the National Hockey League from 1925 to 1939, spending his entire career with the Montreal Canadiens, winning two Stanley Cups, in 1930 and 1931. Lepine, a center, played over 500 games with Montreal and was an excellent goal scorer who could also check and battle for the puck in the corners. He had played senior hockey in Montreal with the Royals, Hochelega and Nationale squads.

After 13 years in the NHL, Lepine finally played a year in the minors with the New Haven Eagles of the AHL in 1938–39.

When Babe Siebert drowned in 1939 after being named the coach of the Canadiens, Lepine was named coach for the 1939–40 season. The erosion of talent from older players and failure to bring in adequate youngsters doomed the team to a last place finish that season and he was fired and replaced by Dick Irvin, who would rebuild the team.

Pit suffered a paralytic stroke in 1951, and had two more strokes in 1954. He died August 2, 1955, in a convalescent home in Ste-Rose, Quebec, from effects of these strokes, only three days after he turned 54. Alfred was the brother of Hector Lépine.

Career statistics

NHL coaching record

See also
 List of players with 5 or more goals in an NHL game

External links
 

1901 births
1955 deaths
Canadian ice hockey centres
Ice hockey people from Quebec
Montreal Canadiens coaches
Montreal Canadiens players
People from Sainte-Anne-de-Bellevue, Quebec
Stanley Cup champions